On 11 March 2021, a fire occurred at a clothing factory in Cairo, Egypt. It killed at least 20 people and injured another 24. Fifteen fire trucks were dispatched to extinguish the fire. The fire is being investigated; its cause is not yet known.

References

2021 disasters in Egypt
2021 fires in Africa
2021 fires in Asia
2021 in Egypt
21st century in Cairo
Factory fires
Fires in Egypt
March 2021 events in Egypt